An exhaust heat recovery system turns waste heat energy in exhaust gases into electric energy for batteries or mechanical energy reintroduced on the crankshaft. The technology is of increasing interest as car and heavy-duty vehicle manufacturers continue to increase efficiency, saving fuel and reducing emissions.

Thermal losses of an internal combustion engine 
While technological improvements have greatly reduced the fuel consumption of internal combustion engines, the peak thermal efficiency  of a 4-stroke Otto cycle engine is around 35%, which means that 65% of the energy released from the fuel is lost as heat. High speed Diesel cycle engines fare better with around 45% peak efficiency, but are still far from the maximum theoretical efficiency, with 55% of the fuel energy content rejected as heat.

Exhaust heat recovery technologies

Rankine 

Rankine cycle systems vaporize pressurised water using a steam generator located in the exhaust pipe. As a result of the heating by exhaust gases, the fluid is turned into steam. The steam then drives the expander of the Rankine engine, either a turbine or pistons. This expander can be directly tied to the crankshaft of the thermal engine or linked to an alternator to generate electricity.

UK researchers at Loughborough University and the University of Sussex concluded that waste heat from light-duty vehicle engines in a steam power cycle could deliver fuel economy advantages of  6.3% – 31.7%, depending upon drive cycle, and that high efficiencies can be achieved at practical operating pressures.

Thermoelectric generators (TEG) 
A second technology, thermoelectric generators (Seebeck-, Peltier-, Thomson effects) is also an option to recover heat from the exhaust pipe, but has not been put to practical use in modern cars.

Exhaust Heat Recovery on internal combustion engines with Rankine Cycle Systems

Passenger cars 
Facing the new American, European, Japanese or Chinese regulation, more and more stringent concerning  emissions, exhaust heat recovery sounds like one of the most efficient ways to recover a free energy, since heat is generated in many ways by the engine. Numerous companies develop systems based upon a Rankine Cycle:

BMW 
The German company has been one of the first major to study exhaust heat recovery with a Rankine system called Turbosteamer.

Chevrolet EGHR 
The 2016 Chevrolet Malibu Hybrid car features an Exhaust gas Heat Recovery (EGHR) system to accelerate coolant heat up time. This gives faster heat up of the engine coolant which in turn heats up the engine faster. Less fuel is used giving reduced emissions. This will also quicken cabin heating warm up for passenger comfort and window defrosting. For hybrid applications, it also can warm the battery pack. The cooling system is connected to a heat exchanger placed in the exhaust gas transferring the thermal energy from the exhaust gas to the cooling system. When the engine is warmed up the exhaust gas is diverted to a by-pass pipe.

Honda 
Honda also develops a module based on a Rankine Cycle to improve overall efficiency of hybrid vehicles, by recovering the heat of the engine and turning it into electricity for the battery pack.
In the US highway cycle, the Rankine cycle system regenerated three times as much energy as the vehicle's regenerative braking system.

Exoès 
A French company, Exoès is specialized in designing and manufacturing exhaust heat recovery systems based on Rankine Cycles. The system EVE, Energy Via Exhaust, leads to fuel savings from 5 up to 15%.

Barber Nichols 
Barber-Nichols Inc. develops Rankine technologies for vehicles.

FVV 
The German consortium unites the majority of internal combustion engine manufacturers across the world. Two task forces are currently studying exhaust heat recovery systems on passenger cars.

Trucks 
Renault Trucks: As a part of the All For Fuel Eco Initiative, Renault Trucks studies a Rankine system for long distance vehicles that could lead to 10% fuel savings. The goal is to produce enough energy to feed the components and electronic auxiliaries with electricity and reduce the fuel consumption by reducing the load on the alternator.

WildFire Heat Recovery System (WFHRS) 
Double Arrow Engineerings' WildFire Heat Recovery System (WFHRS) is under development and utilizes wasted heat from both coolant and exhaust. This system mechanically adds power back to the drive-line, utilizing a Rankine engine as the energy conversion method. The WFHRS is designed for a variety of different applications, both fixed and variable RPM, aftermarket and OEM applications, but generally geared toward larger equipment such as large on-highway trucks, diesel generators, large buses and motor-homes, marine vessels, medium duty trucks, etc.

Trains 
IFPEN, Enogia and Alstom are developing a system called Trenergy dedicated to improve train fuel efficiency.

Exhaust heat recovery in sport 
Fuel efficiency, reduction of  emissions, reliability, and costs are necessary parts of Formula 1 manufacturers’ strategies. Automobile sport is also a good place to trial and assess technologies that, once made reliable, and with costs reduced by experience in production, can be adapted to private cars. Formula 1 constructors produced one of the first exhaust heat recovery systems, and nowadays these devices are essential parts of embedded technologies on F1. Heat recovery was scheduled to become mandatory in the 2014 F1 Championship.

References

Energy recovery
Vehicle technology
Automotive technologies